Hermann August Cappelen (1 May 1827 – 8 March 1852) was a Norwegian painter. Cappelen was best known for his melancholic, dramatic and romantic landscape compositions.

Background

Hermann August Cappelen was born in Skien, Norway. He was the son of Diderik von Cappelen (1795–1866) and Margaret Noble Severine Henriette Løvenskiold (1796–1866).  Both the Løvenskiold and Cappelen families were prominent Norwegian families of merchants, land owners, civil servants and politicians. His family were the owners  of prominent iron works and various other properties. His grandfather, Diderik von Cappelen (1761–1828), was member of the Norwegian Constituent Assembly at Eidsvoll in 1814.

He grew up at Holden, a manor in Ulefoss in the Grenland district of the county of Telemark. After school graduation in Skien in 1845, he went to Christiania to take another exam at the Royal Frederick University. He subsequently went to Düsseldorf, where he studied with Hans Gude.  Cappelen was a student at Kunstakademie Düsseldorf under Johann Wilhelm Schirmer in landscape painting class from 1846 to 1850. He is associated with the Düsseldorf school of painting.

Career
Cappelen went on several study tours in Norway: the Gudbrandsdalen and Lom (along with Gude and Johan Fredrik Eckersberg, 1846), Sogn and Hardanger (1847), as well as several summer residence in the countryside around Holden.

His paintings were characterized by breadth and originality, combined with much poetical feeling. His wild designs from Telemark with forests, lakes and streams are filled with a pathetic mood of loneliness and transience. Powerful forms of nature, especially trees and mountains block, is effective in the composition, coloring and playing in the deep moss green tones.

His most productive period was between 1850 and 1852, the two last years of his life. He struggled against gastric cancer of which he died, aged 25, at Düsseldorf in 1852.

Legacy
The most important collection of Cappelen's art is in the National Museum of Art, Architecture and Design. The National Gallery owns three of his major works: Waterfall in Lower Telemark, Forest Lake and Dying Forest , the last unfinished, together with 26 smaller images and studies. There is a mountain landscape by him in the Oslo Kunstforening, the scene of which he took from Telemark. In 1952, a monument to him by Norwegian sculptor Dyre Vaa (1903–1980) was unveiled in a park in Holla.

Notable works
Kvernhus, 1850
Utdøende urskog i uvær, 1851
 Morkne trær, 1851
Tjern i tåke, 1851
Foss i nedre Telemark, 1852
Skogtjern i Nedre Telemark, 1852
Svarttjern, 1852
Møllefossen, 1852
Utdøende urskog, 1852

References

Attribution:
 

Norwegian landscape painters
1827 births
1852 deaths
People from Skien
People from Ulefoss
Kunstakademie Düsseldorf alumni
Düsseldorf school of painting
Norwegian expatriates in Germany
19th-century Norwegian painters
August
Norwegian male painters
19th-century Norwegian male artists